Clay Pirkle is an American farmer and politician from Georgia. Pirkle is a Republican member of Georgia House of Representatives from District 155, representing all of Ben Hill, Irwin, and Turner counties, and portions of Tift and Coffee counties.

Personal life and education
Clay was raised on the family farm in Sycamore, Georgia, which has the slogan, “Christianity Is Our Business, We Farm To Pay Expenses.”  Clay continues to work as a farmer on the family farm.

Clay Pirkle graduated from Georgia Institute of Technology with a Bachelor of Science degree in Economics in 1989 and from the University of Georgia with a Masters of Business Administration in Accounting and Finance in 1990.

Clay is married to his wife Sharron and together they live in Sycamore, Georgia. They have three children, Andrew, DeAnna, and Nathan.

Clay Pirkle is a member of Bethel Baptist Church, where he also serves as Deacon and Treasurer. Clay also serves as a Director for the Scott Dawson Evangelistic Association based in Birmingham, AL.

Career
Clay has held positions as an Economist with the US Government, a Commercial Banker at a local bank, and an Economics Instructor at Darton State College.

Pirkle was elected into the Georgia State House of Representative in July 2015 and was sworn in on August 21, 2015. Representative Pirkle is a member of the following standing House Committees:
 Agriculture & Consumer Affairs
 Science & Technology
 State Properties.

References

External links

Republican Party members of the Georgia House of Representatives
Living people
1967 births
21st-century American politicians